Gerhard von Düsterlho (13 March 1910 – 13 February 1973) was a German rower. He competed in the men's eight event at the 1932 Summer Olympics.

References

1910 births
1973 deaths
German male rowers
Olympic rowers of Germany
Rowers at the 1932 Summer Olympics
Sportspeople from Magdeburg